Axel Stein (born 28 February 1982) is a German actor and comedian.

He was born in Wuppertal and works as an actor in German television and cinema productions.

Filmography 

 1999–2008: Hausmeister Krause (sitcom)
 2000: Ants in the Pants
 2000: Balko (TV series)
 2000: Der Superbulle und die Halbstarken
 2000: 
 2001: Verliebte Jungs
 2002: 
 2002: Knallharte Jungs
 2002: Nüchtern eingeschlafen, betrunken aufgewacht! (short film )
 2002–2004: Axel! (TV series)
 2003: 
 2004: Snowfever
 2005: Barefoot
 2005–2006: Axel! will's wissen (TV series)
 2006: 7 Dwarves: The Forest Is Not Enough
 2007: 
 2007: Tell
 2008: 
 2008: H3 – Halloween Horror Hostel (ProSieben "Funny Movie Teil 2")
 2008: Eine wie keiner (ProSieben "Funny Movie Teil 3")
 2008: Morgen, ihr Luschen! Der Ausbilder-Schmidt-Film
 2009: Bolt – Ein Hund für alle Fälle – animation film; German voice of 'Dino'
 2009: Mord ist mein Geschäft, Liebling
 2009: 
 2010: Lutter – episode "Rote Erde"
 2010: Alarm für Cobra 11 – Die Autobahnpolizei
 2010: Grip – Das Motormagazin – "Lamborghini Gallardo Superlegera"
 2010: Sammys Abenteuer: Die Suche nach der geheimen Passage – German voice of 'Ray'
 2011: Die Superbullen
 2011: 
 2011: Rookie – Fast platt
 2011: Der Blender
 2011: Grip – Das Motormagazin – "Lamborghini Gallardo Superleggera"
 2011: Grip – Das Motormagazin – "Lamborghini Aventador"
 2011: Grip – Das Motormagazin – "Skoda Yeti in Las Vegas"
 2012: Grip – Das Motormagazin – "Skoda Yeti in Namibia"
 2012: Guardians
 2012: Men Do What They Can
 2012: Prosieben 1001 Nacht
 2012: Cologne P.D. – episode "Mit Hieb und Stich"
 2012: Sammys Abenteuer 2 – German voice of 'Ray'
 2013: Turbo & Tacho
 2014: Not My Day
 2014: Tape 13 (director)
 2015: 3 Türken und ein Baby
 2015: Verliebt, verlobt, vertauscht
 2015: Storno – Todsicher versichert
 2015: Shark Tale (German voice role)
 2015: 
 2015: 
 2015: Bruder vor Luder
 2016: Männertag
 2016: Volltreffer
 2016: Dating Alarm
 2017: Schatz, nimm du sie!
 2017: Abi '97 – gefühlt wie damals
 2021: The Vault

Awards 
 2002: German Comedy Awards: Best Newcomer Comedy
 2002: German Comedy Awards: Best Comedy serie for Hausmeister Krause
 2002: German Comedy Awards: Best film for Knallharte Jungs
 2002: Rising Movie Talent Award: Best Newcomer
 2003: Jupiter Filmpreis: Bester Newcomer

References

External links 

 Official website by Axel Stein
 

1982 births
Actors from Wuppertal
Living people
German male film actors
German male television actors
21st-century German male actors